Elections to Rochford Council were held on 7 May 1998.  One third of the council was up for election and the Liberal Democrat party lost overall control of the council to no overall control.

After the election, the composition of the council was
Liberal Democrat 18
Labour 12
Conservative 6
Residents 3
Independent 1

Election result

Ward results

Downhall

Grange & Rawreth

Hawkwell East

Hockley East

Hullbridge Riverside

Hullbridge South

Lodge

Rayleigh Central

Rochford Eastwood

Rochford Roche

Rochford St. Andrew's

Trinity

Wheatley

Whitehouse

References

1998
1998 English local elections
1990s in Essex